Champagne Basket is a French professional basketball club that is based in both the cities of Reims and Châlons-en-Champagne. The club was established in 2010 as part of the union between the old clubs of Reims Champagne Basket club (RCB) and the ESPE Basket Pro club of Châlons-en-Champagne. Since 2022, the team plays in the LNB Pro B, the second tier division of French basketball.

History
The historical regional rivals of Reims Champagne Basket club (RCB) and the ESPE Basket Pro club of Châlons-en-Champagne, combined forces to create a strong, financially stable, competitive ball club on the French elite professional stage. The club was founded as Champagne Châlons-Reims Basket (CCRB) on 17 June 2010. Two years following up the union, the Ligue Nationale de Basket (LNB) invited the CCRB to move up directly to the LNB Pro A through a wild-card. 

In 2020, the club changed its name to "Champagne Basket".

Arenas
The club's home arenas are the Complexe Sportif René Tys (Reims) and the Palais des Sports Pierre de Coubertin (Châlons). Each arena hosts half of their home games.

Season by season

Players

Current roster

<noinclude>

Notable players

References

External links 
 Official website

Reims